The 2013 Pan American Combined Events Cup was held in Ottawa, Ontario, Canada, at the Terry Fox Stadium on June 1–2, 2013. 
The event was held jointly with the Athletics Ontario Senior Combined Events
Championships and the Québec Canada Games Trials. 
A detailed report on the event and an appraisal of the results was given.

Complete results were published.

Medallists

Results

Men's Decathlon
Key

†: Junior athlete using junior implements.

Women's Heptathlon
Key

†: Junior athlete using junior implements.

Participation
An unofficial count yields the participation of 27 athletes from 11 countries in the senior events.

 (1)
 (1)
 (4)
 (2)
 (1)
 (5)
 (3)
 (1)
 (1)
 (2)
 (6)

See also
 2013 in athletics (track and field)

References

Pan American Combined Events Cup
Pan American Combined Events Cup
International track and field competitions hosted by Canada
Pan American Combined Events Cup
Pan American Combined Events Cup